Abbas Almosawi (born 1952) is a Bahraini painter.

Biography 

Abbas Almosawi is a professional artist for more than forty years and the founder of the Art & Peace Project in 1991.

Education and qualifications

 1975 Diploma from Teacher Training college, Bahrain
 1979 BA in Interior Design from University of Cairo
 1986 A specialized course organized by US Embassy to have a tour at American Arts

Selected solo exhibitions

 1977 Art Exhibition at Sheraton Hotel, Manama, Bahrain 
 1985 Art Exhibition at Bahrain Arts Society 
 1986 Art Exhibition at British Bank of the Middle East, Manama, Bahrain 
 1991 Gulf War Exhibition, Sheraton Hotel, Manama, Bahrain 
 1993 Gallery Caldarese, Bologna 
 1995 Art Exhibition at United Nations, Geneva, Switzerland 
 1996 Art Exhibition in Paris, Geneva, and Lausanne, Switzerland. 
 1998 25 years of professional art, Bahrain Arts Centre & Bahrain Arts Society, Bahrain 
 2000 Art Exhibition at Al Riwaq Gallery at Adleya, Bahrain
 2006 Arab Countries League, Cairo, Egypt   
 Selected Group Exhibitions: 
 1985-2011: Art Exhibitions in  Mauritius, Egypt, Oman, Switzerland, France, Russia, Taipei, India, Kuwait, Morocco, China, Jordan, UK, Ireland, and Tunisia 
 2003 Art Exhibition in London with H. E. Shaikh Rashed Al-Khalifa
 2005 Fine Art Exhibition in Taiwan with H. E. Shaikh Rashed Al-Khalifa

Peace projects 

 1993 Inauguration of Peace Project on 10 July 1993 at the Bahrain Contemporary Arts Society
 1995 Peace Project in Germany
 1995 Peace Project in Oman
 1996 Peace Project in Castle M., Italy
 1997 Peace Project in Milan, Italy 
 1997 Peace Project in Palace of UN on the UN 50th Anniversary with 1000 artists and children   
 2001 New Millennium Peace Message in Tree of Life with 2000 students from private schools 
 2005 Peace Project in Geneve, Switzerland on the UN 60th Anniversary with 192 countries   
 2006 Peace Project in Arab Countries League in Cairo on the UN 60th Anniversary with 500 artists and children 
 2007 Peace Project in China with 100 children and 20 artists
 2013 Opening of Peace & Art House in Janabeya
 2015 Invitation from UN Secretary to hold Peace Project in New York on the UN 70th anniversary

Selected awards and prizes 

 1977 First Prize, Gulf Air Competition for Shareholding Countries 
 1978 First Prize, Dilmun Prize, Annual Exhibition, Ministry of Information, Bahrain 
 1984 First Prize, Competition for Centennial Stamp Serries, Bahrain Postal Services 
 1990 Al Danah Award, National Day Exhibition, Kuwait 
 2003 Malwan Award, Saudi Arabian Airlines, Jeddah 
 2009 First Degree Competency Award from H. M. King of Bahrain

References

External links
Abbas Almosawi

1952 births
Living people
Bahraini artists
Cairo University alumni
Bahraini contemporary artists